Raul Pizarro (born 1975) is a queer, disabled, latinx visual artist who known for his Day of the Dead series, as well as his paintings about his queerness and his disability.

Background 
Pizarro was born in 1975 in Mexicali, Mexico, and moved to Southern California.

Pizarro was diagnosed with muscular dystrophy, and since he was unable to continue making large canvas paintings, his paintings were smaller. In 2016, engineers from the Northrop Grumman FabLab at the Redondo Beach Space Park created a remote-controlled easel allowing him access to paint any size canvas.

That same year, Pizarro received funding for a van to support his wheelchair through the "Raul Pizarro's Wheelchair Van" Gofundme on gofundme.com, set up by Holly Vredenburg.

Notable Art 
Pizarro's paintings focus on the artists' intersectional identities as a disabled, queer, Latinx person raised evangelical. His visual work explores relationship between religion, disability and queerness.

In 2012, Pizarro worked with Self Help Graphics to create Sharia, a limited edition serigraph inspired by works of art pertaining to Islamic Law.

In 2014, Pizarro was the subject of the Emmy nominated documentary Raul Pizarro: Fuerza Incansable produced by Univision.

Pizarro's Songs for a Deaf God series is a collection of oil on canvas paintings focus on identity and the intersection of gender identity, mental illness, and disability, namely in a religious context.

Pizarro's Feral Allegories series, a collection of oil paintings, were inspired for Pizarro's relationship with his nephew. The paintings helped him develop a special connection to his nephew, communicating through images of bears and pandas.

In 2022, Pizarro worked on the Tiangius Project, creating a series centered around the experience of immigrants.

Further reading 

 Márquez, L. 2019, ‘Retrospective show in Pomona brings visibility for this artist’,  Inland Valley Daily Bulletin, https://www.dailybulletin.com/2019/12/27/retrospective-show-in-pomona-brings-visibility-for-this-artist/
 Vera, V. 2020, ‘Moments Of Reflection And Acceptance: Life Of A Disabled Latino Artist’, Latino USA, https://www.latinousa.org/2020/01/30/rpizarro/ 
 Interview: Raul Pizarro, The DA Center for The Arts, 2011, https://thedacenterforthearts.wordpress.com/2011/10/05/interview-raul-pizarro/ 
 Maxwell, A., 2017, Disability Takes Flight When Accessibility is Engineered, Now. The intersection of technology, innovation & creativity, Northrop Grumman, https://now.northropgrumman.com/disabilities-take-flight-when-accessibility-is-engineered/
 Dearborn, Emily. ""History, Hardships, & Unheard Voices" of Queer Resilient Beings: A Kerckhoff Exhibit". https://outwritenewsmag.org/2017/03/history-hardships-unheard-voices-of-queer-resilient-beings-a-kerckhoff-exhibit/
 "Meet Raul Pizarro", VoyageLA, http://voyagela.com/interview/meet-raul-pizarro-raul-pizarro-montclair-ca/
 "California Community Foundation Unveils 'We Are Los Angeles" Public Art Exhibit in Honor of Foundation Centennial", GlobeNewswire, https://www.globenewswire.com/news-release/2016/11/12/889385/10165983/en/California-Community-Foundation-Unveils-We-Are-Los-Angeles-Public-Art-Exhibit-in-Honor-of-Foundation-s-Centennial.html
 "Raul Pizarro: Allegories of an Invisible Brown Boy", Da Center for the Arts, https://www.dacenter.org/events-1/raulpizarro2020
 "Self Help Graphics and Art archives", Online Archive of California, https://oac.cdlib.org/view?style=oac4;view=dsc;docId=kt096nc9xv&dsc.position=2501
 "Raul B. Pizarro", Calfund.org, https://www.calfund.org/centennial/wala/artists/raul-pizarro/

References 

1975 births

Living people
Queer artists
Artists with disabilities
People with muscular dystrophy
Religious artists
Artists from California